Thirkell is a surname. People with that name include:

 Angela Thirkell (18901961), English-born Australian novelist
 John Thirkell (born 1958), British trumpet and flugelhorn player
 Percy Thirkell (190097), English footballer
 Richard Thirkell (AKA Richard Thirkeld, died 1583), English Roman Catholic priest and martyr

See also 
 Eric Thirkell Cooper (before 1915 – after 1947), British soldier and war poet during World War 1
 Herbert Thirkell White (18551931), Lieutenant Governor of Burma 190510, author of several books on Burma